Australia is home to four professional football codes. This is a comprehensive list of crowd figures for Australian football codes in 2012. It includes several different competitions and matches from Australian rules football, Association football (Soccer), rugby league and rugby union and International rules football which is hybrid game played between Australian & Ireland which takes aspect from Australian rules football & Gaelic football. Melbourne, Sydney and Brisbane have teams represented in all four codes. Hobart and Darwin are Australia's only capital cities without a professional football team though they are home to professional games of Australian Football.

There are two changes to the professional clubs across the four competitions, with the addition of Greater Western Sydney Giants to the AFL, bringing that competition to a total of 18 Australian clubs, and the addition of the Western Sydney Wanderers in the A-League replacing the now defunct Gold Coast United.

Included competitions

National competitions
Several football codes have national (domestic) competitions in Australia, the following are taken into consideration:

The 2012–13 A-League season (A-L)
 2012–13 A-League regular season
 2012–13 A-League final series
The 2012 Australian Football League season (AFL)
 2012 NAB Cup
 2012 AFL regular season
 2012 AFL finals series
The 2012 National Rugby League season (NRL)
 2012 NRL regular season
 2012 NRL finals series
The 2012 Super Rugby season (SR)
 2012 Super Rugby season
 2012 Super Rugby finals series

Two of these leagues, specifically the NRL and A-League, have one club each in New Zealand, while only five of the fifteen Super Rugby franchises are located in Australia, with the other ten are split evenly between New Zealand and South Africa. Attendance figures for non-Australian clubs are not taken into account in the figures on this page.

Other competitions
Other competitions, such as international and representative competitions, included are:

The 2012 AFC Champions League (ACL)
The 2012 State of Origin series (SoO)
The 2012 Tri Nations Series (Tri Nat)

Note: For these competitions, only figures for games that take place in Australia are taken into account.

No Rugby League Four Nations competition is scheduled for 2012 to provide players with a break in the lead up to the 2013 Rugby League World Cup.

Non-competition games
Some non-competition matches (such as friendly and exhibition matches) are also included:

Home test matches played by the Australian National Rugby League Team, the Kangaroos, in 2012.
Home test matches played by the Australian National Association Football Team, the Socceroos, in 2012.
Home test matches played by the Australian National Rugby Union Team, the Wallabies, in 2012.
NRL All Stars match, in 2012.
City vs Country Origin match, in 2012.
 Flood Appeal: Legends of Origin match, celebrity and former player charity exhibition match
E. J. Whitten Legends Game, celebrity and former player Australian Rules charity exhibition match

Note: this list will be updated as more games are scheduled. The 2012 ANZAC Test was held in Auckland, New Zealand with a crowd of 35,329.

Competitions not included
There are several notable semi-professional regional and state based competitions which draw notable attendances and charge an entry fee that are not listed here.  These are worth mentioning as some of their attendances rival those of national competitions and compete for spectator interest.

These include (ranked by approximate season attendances):

*includes finals

As the attendance figures for some of these competitions can be difficult to obtain (many don't publish season figures and some play matches as curtain raisers to other events), they have not been included in the official lists.

Attendances by Code
In order to directly compare sports, the total attendances for each major code are listed here. The colour-coding of the different codes is used throughout the article.

Note that only the competitions that appear on this page excluding those specifically not included are considered, there are many other (generally smaller) competitions, leagues and matches that take place for all of the football codes, but these are not included. The following are included:

 Rugby union attendances include some games from the Super 14.
 The Rugby league figures include representative matches (State of Origin and International Tests Matches).
 Association football (soccer) attendances include A-League regular season and finals matches, and local attendances for international representative matches.

Attendances by League
Some codes have multiple competitions, several competitions are compared here.

Only matches and competitions specifically controlled and sanctioned by each league are counted; matches such as inter-club trial matches are not counted.

Attendances by Team
Total home attendances for domestic league competitions are listed here.

Teams are listed by competition – tournament and league competitions that are more than one game in length are taken into consideration.

Attendances by Match
Attendances for single matches are listed here. Note that not all matches are necessarily included.

Representative Competitions
These are matches that are part of a regular representative competition.

Single matches
These are once-off matches, that aren't part of any regular league competition.

Preseason
Due to the irregular nature of the Round 1 matches of the 2011 NAB Cup, each set of three Round 1 matches are counted as one match.

Finals

Regular season

See also
Australian rules football attendance records
2013 NRL season results
Sports attendance
List of sports venues in Australia

Notes

External links
 Official Website of the Australian Football League
 National Rugby League
 A-League Official website
 Asian Champions League Official website

2012 in Australian rugby league
2012 in Australian rugby union
2012 in Australian soccer
2012 in Australian rules football
2012